Arnaud Méla (born 9 January 1980 in Saint-Gaudens, Haute-Garonne, France) is a rugby union player for CA Brive in the Top 14. Méla's position of choice is at lock. He previously played for SC Albi.

He was called up to the France squad for the 2008 Six Nations Championship. He made his France debut against Scotland on 3 February 2008 at Murrayfield.

References

External links
 CA Brive profile
 France profile
RBS 6 Nations profile

1980 births
Living people
People from Saint-Gaudens, Haute-Garonne
French rugby union players
Rugby union locks
CA Brive players
France international rugby union players
Sportspeople from Haute-Garonne